Wenbi Tower is a tower in Changzhou, China, located near Hongmei Park. It was built during the Southern Dynasties, Qi Gaozu, Xiao Daocheng, Jianyuan (479－482), and first named Jianyuan Temple. Later, it was changed to Peace Tower. Because the tower looks like a pen, people changed the name into Wenbi Tower. As time went on, the temple had been deteriorated because of wars, natural disasters and the Cultural Revolution. Not until the Chinese economic reform did Liu Biru, a Chinese-American, subsidized restoration of the temple in 1982.

Description 
Wenbi Tower is 48.38 meters tall, and the bottom outside diameter is 9.58 meters. It is made up of wood and brick, which has seven floors and eight faces.

References

Towers in China
Buildings and structures in Changzhou
Tourist attractions in Jiangsu